The Overland Limited is a 1925 American silent film, directed by Frank O'Neill and produced by Sam Sax with cinematography by Jack MacKenzie. The story was written by James J. Tynan. The film was released July 14, 1925 in New York.

Plot
The film starred Malcolm McGregor as an idealistic young railroad engineer who designs and builds a new railroad bridge, and Olive Borden as his love interest. The conflicting male lead is played by Ralph Lewis as the railway engineer who ultimately saves a trainload of passengers from the dangerous bridge.

The picture concludes with a model set of a steam locomotive breaking through the steel girders and plunging into the river.

Cast
 Malcolm McGregor as David Barton (male lead)
 Olive Borden as Ruth Dent (female lead)
 Charles Hill Mailes as Schuyler Dent
 Evelyn Jennings as Agnes Jennings
 Alice Lake as Violet Colton
 Ralph Lewis as Ed Barton
 Charles Post as "One Round" Farrell
 Ethel Wales as Mrs. Barton
 Charles West as Bitterroot Jackson

Release
The film's final scene was promoted with the tagline: "Like a steel comet, the mighty locomotive was hurled into the foaming waters below! The crashing climax of the greatest railroad photo-play ever made".

The film was released in the UK as The Mad Train and in Italy as Nastro d'Acciaio.

References

External links
 

1925 films
American silent feature films
American black-and-white films
Gotham Pictures films
1920s American films